"Growing on Me" is a song by British rock band the Darkness from their 2003 debut album, Permission to Land.  It was released as the second single on 16 June 2003, peaking at number 11 on the UK Singles Chart. It also charted at number 42 and 46 in Ireland and Australia, respectively.

Background
Despite rumours surrounding the song's meaning, lead singer Justin Hawkins has refuted suggestions that the lyrics pertain to pubic lice or sexually transmitted infections: "People have said it's about pubic lice, but that's obviously wrong because pubic lice don't grow on you, do they?"  Hawkins has also commented on the song's true meaning: "A sweet lady woman that you will never fully fathom or understand, but you love her so much that after a while it doesn't matter."

Music video
The video opens with the reoccurring spaceship seen in later singles, the ship gets mounted by a Pterodactyl attempting to mate with the structure, the ship eventually lands over a large riverbank and dispenses four pods containing each band member as a child. The children all enter a helicopter flying towards a much larger estate and the band members exit the helicopter fully grown. Eventually the band begin performing the song around the Estate including various moments of humor as Justin Hawkins is singing naked from a bathtub or Dan Hawkins is able to fire missiles out of his Les Paul.

Track listings
 UK CD and digital single, Australian CD single
 "Growing on Me"
 "How Dare You Call This Love?"
 "Bareback"

 UK 7-inch single
A. "Growing on Me"
B. "How Dare You Call This Love?"

 UK DVD single
 "Growing on Me" (video + out-takes)
 "Growing on Me" (audio)

Credits and personnel
Credits are taken from the Permission to Land album booklet.

Studios
 Recorded at Chapel Studios (Lincolnshire, England)
 Additional vocals recorded at Paul Smith Music Studios (London, England)
 Mixed at Roundhouse Recording Studios (London, England)
 Mastered at The Exchange (London, England)

Personnel

 Justin Hawkins – writing, vocals, guitar, synthesizer, piano
 Dan Hawkins – writing, guitar
 Frankie Poullain – writing, bass
 Ed Graham – writing, drums
 Pedro Ferreira – production, mixing, engineering
 Will Bartle – recording assistant
 Nick Taylor – mixing assistant
 Mike Marsh – mastering

Charts

Release history

In popular culture
The song is featured in the soundtrack to the film School of Rock, despite not actually appearing in the motion picture. The film itself contains another song by the Darkness, "Black Shuck". This change is likely due to the strong language in "Black Shuck"; changing the song on the released soundtrack would avoid an advisory sticker on the release and allow members of the target audience—namely children—to widely purchase the album. It was also featured in the 2004 film Going the Distance.

References

2003 singles
2003 songs
Atlantic Records singles
The Darkness (band) songs
Songs written by Dan Hawkins (musician)
Songs written by Ed Graham
Songs written by Frankie Poullain
Songs written by Justin Hawkins